Mr. and Miss Pennsylvania Basketball is a yearly award given to the best high school basketball player in Pennsylvania. Twenty-five of each boys and girls student athletes are nominated by PAbball.com and states coaches and media vote for final six nominees and the public along with coaches votes for the winner.

Winners
Bold = Active professionally 

* Active Collegiately

2014
 Boys: J.C. Show* — Abington Heights, Guard
 Girls: Erin Mathias* — Fox Chapel, Forward

2015
 Boys: Derrick Jones Jr. — Archbishop Carroll, Forward
 Girls: Kelly Jekot* — Cumberland Valley, Guard

2016
 Boys: Tony Carr — Roman Catholic, Guard
 Girls: Kelly Jekot* — Cumberland Valley, Guard

2017
 Boys: Lonnie Walker — Reading, Guard
 Girls: Abby Kapp — Boyertown, Forward

2018
 Boys: Cameron Reddish — Norristown, Forward
 Girls: Taylor O'Brien, — Plymouth Whitemarsh, Guard

2019
Boys: Eric Dixon* — Abington, Forward
Girls: Alli Campbell — Bellwood-Antis, Guard

2020
Boys: Ethan Morton — Butler, Forward
Girls: Diamond Johnson — Neumann-Goretti, Guard

2021
Boys: Stevie Mitchell — Wilson, Guard
Girls: Lucy Olsen — Spring-Ford, Guard

Winners by high school

References

Basketball-related lists
Mr. and Miss Basketball awards
Lists of people from Pennsylvania
Pennsylvania sports-related lists